Airport Terminal 3 is a rapid transit station on the Red Line of the Dubai Metro in Dubai, UAE, serving the Terminal 3 of Dubai International Airport.

The station opened as part of the Red Line on 9 September 2009. It is close to the Emirates Group Headquarters. The station is also close to a number of bus routes.

The station consists of 2 tracks and 2 exits, one for getting off the station and one for connecting to the airport.

References

External links
 Dubai Metro Red Line | Airport Terminal 3 To Terminal 1 on YouTube

Railway stations in the United Arab Emirates opened in 2009
Dubai Metro stations